Rilawala Grama Niladhari Division is a  Grama Niladhari Division of the  Homagama Divisional Secretariat  of Colombo District  of Western Province, Sri Lanka .  It has Grama Niladhari Division Code 593A.

Polgasowita and Kahathuduwa  are located within, nearby or associated with Rilawala.

Rilawala is a surrounded by the  Kahathuduwa West, Kirigampamunuwa, Siyambalagoda South, Wethara, Undurugoda and Siyambalagoda North  Grama Niladhari Divisions.

Demographics

Ethnicity 

The Rilawala Grama Niladhari Division has  a Sinhalese majority (99.4%) . In comparison, the Homagama Divisional Secretariat (which contains the Rilawala Grama Niladhari Division) has  a Sinhalese majority (98.1%)

Religion 

The Rilawala Grama Niladhari Division has  a Buddhist majority (98.4%) . In comparison, the Homagama Divisional Secretariat (which contains the Rilawala Grama Niladhari Division) has  a Buddhist majority (96.2%)

References 

Grama Niladhari Divisions of Homagama Divisional Secretariat